HMCS Baleine was a minesweeper that saw service with the Royal Canadian Navy from 1915 to 1919, during the First World War. Converted from an ocean-going tug, the vessel was used as an auxiliary minesweeper under charter and manned by a civilian crew.

References

Minesweepers of the Royal Canadian Navy
1915 ships